Piveh Zhan (also Romanized as Pīveh Zhan; also known as Bivāzhān) is a village in Piveh Zhan Rural District, Ahmadabad District, Mashhad County, Razavi Khorasan Province, Iran. At the 2006 census, its population was 891, in 315 families.

References 

Populated places in Mashhad County